The Kingdom of Burgundy, known from the 12th century as the Kingdom of Arles, also referred to in various context as Arelat, the Kingdom of Arles and Vienne, or Kingdom of Burgundy-Provence, was a realm established in 933 by the merger of the kingdoms of Upper and Lower Burgundy under King Rudolf II. It was incorporated into the Holy Roman Empire in 1033 and from then on was one of the empire's three constituent realms, together with the Kingdom of Germany and the Kingdom of Italy. By the mid-13th century at the latest, however, it had lost its concrete political relevance.

Its territory stretched from the Mediterranean Sea to the High Rhine River in the north, roughly corresponding to the present-day French regions of Provence-Alpes-Côte d'Azur, Rhône-Alpes and Franche-Comté, as well as western Switzerland. Until 1032 it was ruled by independent kings of the Elder House of Welf.

Carolingian Burgundy
Since the conquest of the First Burgundian kingdom by the Franks in 534, its territory had been ruled within the Frankish and Carolingian Empire. In 843, the three surviving sons of Emperor Louis the Pious, who had died in 840, signed the Treaty of Verdun which partitioned the Carolingian Empire among them: the former Burgundian kingdom became part of Middle Francia, which was allotted to Emperor Lothair I (Lotharii Regnum), with the exception of the later Duchy of Burgundy—the present-day Bourgogne—which went to Charles the Bald, king of West Francia. King Louis the German received East Francia, comprising the territory east of the Rhine River.

Shortly before his death in 855, Emperor Lothair I in turn divided his realm among his three sons in accordance with the Treaty of Prüm. His Burgundian heritage would pass to his younger son Charles of Provence (845–863). Then in 869 Lothair I's son, Lothair II, died without legitimate children, and in 870 his uncle Charles the Bald and Louis the German by the 870 Treaty of Meerssen partitioned his territory: Upper Burgundy, the territory north of the Jura mountains (Bourgogne Transjurane), went to Louis the German, while the rest went to Charles the Bald. By 875 all sons of Lothair I had died without heirs and the other Burgundian territories were held by Charles the Bald.

Formation of the kingdom

In the confusion after the death of Charles' son Louis the Stammerer in 879, the West Frankish count Boso of Provence established the Kingdom of Lower Burgundy (Bourgogne Cisjurane) at Arles. In 888, upon the death of the Emperor Charles the Fat, son of Louis the German, Count Rudolph of Auxerre, Count of Burgundy, founded the Kingdom of Upper Burgundy at Saint-Maurice which included the County of Burgundy, in northwestern Upper Burgundy.

In 933, Hugh of Arles ceded Lower Burgundy to Rudolph II of Upper Burgundy in return for Rudolph relinquishing his claim to the Italian throne. Rudolph merged both Upper and Lower Burgundy to form the Kingdom of Arles (Arelat). In 937, Rudolph was succeeded by his son Conrad the Peaceful. Inheritance claims by Hugh of Arles were rejected, with the support of Emperor Otto I.

In 993, Conrad was succeeded by his son Rudolph III, who in 1006 was forced to sign a succession treaty in favor of the future Emperor Henry II. Rudolph attempted to renounce the treaty in 1016 without success.

Imperial kingdom

In 1032, Rudolph III died without any surviving heirs, and, in accordance with the 1006 treaty, the kingdom passed to Henry's successor, Emperor Conrad II from the Salian dynasty, and Arelat was incorporated in the Holy Roman Empire, though the kingdom's territories operated with considerable autonomy.  Though from that time the emperors held the title "King of Arles", few went to be crowned in the cathedral of Arles. An exception was Frederick Barbarossa, who in 1157 held a diet in Besançon and in 1178 was crowned King of Burgundy by the archbishop of Arles.

The Vivarais see of Viviers was the first of the kingdom's territories to be annexed to the Kingdom of France, gradually during the 13th century with formal recognition in 1306. The Lyonnais had been practically beyond the reach of the Empire since the late 12th century. Its incorporation into France was the result of internal conflicts between the Archbishop of Lyon, the cathedral chapter and the city council. It was cemented in the early 14th century and formalized in a 1312 treaty between Archbishop Peter of Savoy and Philip IV of France. Emperor Henry VII protested against this but did not seriously challenge it. The Dauphiné was effectively annexed by France through a series of largely accidental developments between 1343 and 1349, but the issue of whether the king or emperor had ultimate sovereignty over it was left unclear until well into the 15th century.. The County of Provence was ruled by junior branches of the House of France from 1246 onwards, but only became formally part of the Kingdom of France with the death of Charles du Maine on 11 December 1481.

A stillborn attempt to revive the kingdom of Burgundy/Arles was made by Charles of Anjou in coordination with Pope Nicholas III. Between 1277 and 1279, Charles, at that time already King of Sicily, Rudolf of Habsburg, King of the Romans and aspirant to the Imperial crown, and Margaret of Provence, queen dowager of France, settled their dispute over the County of Provence, and also over Rudolf's bid to become the sole Imperial candidate.  Rudolf agreed that his daughter Clemence of Austria would marry Charles's grandson Charles Martel of Anjou, with the whole Arelat kingdom as her dowry. In exchange, Charles would support the imperial crown being made hereditary in the House of Habsburg. Nicholas III expected Northern Italy to become a kingdom carved out of the Imperial territory, to be given to his family, the Orsini. In 1282, Charles was ready to send the child couple to reclaim the old royal title of Kings of Arles, but the War of the Sicilian Vespers frustrated his plans.

On 4 June 1365, Charles IV was the last emperor to be crowned king at Arles, after a gap of nearly two centuries following the previous Arlesian coronation of Frederick I in 1178. That attempt to revive the imperial hold on the kingdom did not succeed, however, and as a consequence Charles annexed the County of Savoy to the Kingdom of Germany.
During his visit to Paris in early 1378, Charles IV granted the title of Imperial vicar over the Kingdom of Arles to the nine-year-old Dauphin Charles of France, later King Charles VI, but only for his lifetime (i.e. not lineally). The title "King of Arles" remained one of the Holy Roman Emperor's subsidiary titles until the dissolution of the Empire in 1806. The Archbishop of Trier continued to act as archchancellor of Burgundy/Arles, as codified by the Golden Bull of 1356.

See also
 Kings of Burgundy

References

Literature

States and territories established in the 930s
States and territories disestablished in 1378
11th century in the Holy Roman Empire
Former monarchies of Europe
Kingdom of Burgundy
Kingdom of Arles
1378 disestablishments in Europe
Medieval Switzerland
933 establishments
1030s establishments in the Holy Roman Empire
1032 establishments in Europe
Monarchy of the Holy Roman Empire
History of Provence-Alpes-Côte d'Azur
History of Rhône-Alpes
History of Franche-Comté
10th-century establishments in France
10th-century establishments in Europe

de:Königreich Burgund#Königreich Arelat